Adam John Glossbrenner (August 31, 1810 – March 1, 1889) was a Democratic member of the U.S. House of Representatives from Pennsylvania.

Biography
Adam J. Glossbrenner was born in Hagerstown, Maryland.  He learned the art of printing, and became publisher of the Western Telegraph in Hamilton, Ohio, in 1827 and 1828. He moved to York, Pennsylvania, in 1829. He established the York County Farmer in 1831, and became a partner in the York Gazette in 1835, and continued his connection with that paper until 1860.

He served as clerk in the Pennsylvania State House of Representatives in 1836. He was Clerk of the United States House of Representatives during the Twenty-eighth and Twenty-ninth Congresses, and in the United States Department of State at Washington, D.C., in 1848 and 1849.

He was Sergeant at Arms of the United States House of Representatives from 1850 to 1860.  He served as private secretary to President James Buchanan in 1860 and 1861. He established the Philadelphia Age in 1862, although residing in York, Pennsylvania.

Glossbrenner was elected as a Democrat to the Thirty-ninth and Fortieth Congresses. He was an unsuccessful candidate for reelection in 1868.

Following his political career he engaged in banking in York in 1872. He moved to Philadelphia in 1880, and was in the employ of the Pennsylvania Railroad Company until his death in that city in 1889, aged 78. He was interred in Prospect Hill Cemetery in York, Pennsylvania.

Sources

The Political Graveyard

External links
 

1810 births
1889 deaths
Sergeants at Arms of the United States House of Representatives
Politicians from Philadelphia
Politicians from York, Pennsylvania
Democratic Party members of the United States House of Representatives from Pennsylvania
19th-century American politicians